Citybus Route 1 is a bus route operated by Citybus (CTB) on Hong Kong Island, running between Felix Villas and Happy Valley (Upper) via Kennedy Town, Sheung Wan, Central and Wan Chai.

It is one of the oldest existing bus routes in Hong Kong, having been in continuous operation ever since 1928 (except for a short break during the Japanese occupation).

History
The route was started on 5 November 1928 by Hong Kong Tramways, between Sai Wan and Happy Valley. At that time, it had no route number. Just several days after the inauguration of service, the western terminus was changed to Sheung Wan near Wing Lok Pier, in response to requests from the police. 

On 11 June 1933 China Motor Bus gained the franchise of Hong Kong Island bus services, and the route was given the number "1". The route was truncated from Sheung Wan to Blake Pier in Central on the same day, before relocating its terminus to the neighbouring Vehicular Ferry Pier in 1934. On 1 April 1935, the service was extended to Sai Ying Pun, and the arrangement of having first and second class ticket prices was added. However, on 1 January 1939 the route was cut back to Vehicular Ferry Pier, the terminal before 1935.

During Japanese occupation, the route was suspended. Within a month after the restoration of British rule, limited service on the route was resumed on 22 September 1945 between Vehicular Ferry Pier and Tai Hang via Happy Valley. In January 1946 the terminus was modified to Central Market. At this time there were five buses servicing the route, when the route was the only one in service by CMB. In February there were only three buses left due to lack of repair, and the route was divided into two separate services, Central Market – Tai Hang and Vehicular Ferry Pier – Happy Valley. In May service was resumed on route 5, so the terminus of route 1 was changed to Central Ferry Piers, with two buses servicing. By next February there were six buses on the route.

The early 1960s saw both of route 1's termini being relocated. On 1 January 1960 the route was extended from the Vehicular Ferry Pier to Cleverly Street in Sheung Wan, while in 1962 the Happy Valley terminus was changed from Blue Pool Road to Broom Road. In 1972 the route was classified into the category of urban slope routes, which had a higher price than normal urban routes and lead to a loss of patronage. In 1980 the western terminus of the route was changed to Central (Macau Ferry), and again in 1987 to Rumsey Street. On 1 September 1993 the route was transferred to CTB, and was designated a full air-conditioned service. On 31 May 1996 the Central terminus was moved to a new bus terminal of the same name, on newly reclaimed land.

Route numbering controversy
After the acquisition of CTB by Chow Tai Fook, NWFB's mother company, the rearrangement of bus services lead to a proposal of merger of the route with 5A, which ran between Happy Valley (Lower) and Felix Villas. Such a amalgamation was mooted as early as 1986 when the routes were still operated by CMB, but had never been approved well until 2004.

Under the original proposals the resultant route would perpetuate the route number "5A", but community leaders had divided opinions regarding whether "5A" or "1" should be retained. The Wan Chai District Council insisted on the former, an opinion that councillors of Central and Western District objected to. Suggestions of naming the route "1/5A" were rejected by Citybus, citing the reason that the slash was unavailable on rollsigns. It was later decided that the merger would take place as scheduled on 31 May 2004, and the merged route plying between Kennedy Town (Belcher Bay) and Happy Valley (Upper) would take on both the numbers of "1" and "5A" for the time being. This unique arrangement meant that buses displaying the two numbers would depart alternately from the same termini. On 28 June 2004 the terminus in Kennedy Town was switched to Sai Ning Street bus terminus. 

The use of two numbers for the same route led to confusion among the public. In view of this the two aforementioned district councils reached the consensus that only one number should be adopted for the merged route, and the decision should be made through a public opinion survey. Among the 1,056 passengers of 1/5A passengers surveyed, 38% believed that the route should be named "1", while 25% called for the retention of "5A". Consequently, route 5A was put out of service.

Recent developments
As a result of the MTR West Island line Extension, Citybus Route 5 was cancelled whilst the route was extended to Felix Villas effective 10 May 2015. As of 2015, route 1 held the record of being the bus service in Hong Kong with the highest number of terminus modifications (15 times), with 4 pre-war and 11 post-war.

Route

Felix Villas to Happy Valley (Upper)
The journey distance from Felix Villas to Happy Valley (Upper) is 9.9 km in 53 minutes time, via:
Victoria Road
Cadogan Street
Catchick Street
Kennedy Town Praya
Des Voeux Road West
Connaught Road Central
Cleverly Street
Des Voeux Road Central
Chater Road
Murray Road
Queensway
Hennessy Road
Fleming Road
Wan Chai Road
Morrison Hill Road
Sports Road
Wong Nai Chung Road
Sing Woo Road
Green Lane
Broom Road

Happy Valley (Upper) to Felix Villas
The journey distance from Happy Valley (Upper) to Felix Villas is 9.9 km in 53 minutes time, via:
Broom Road
Blue Pool Road
Sing Woo Road
King Kwong Street
Shan Kwong Road
Wong Nai Chung Road
Morrison Hill Road
Wan Chai Road
Fleming Road
Hennessy Road
Queensway
Des Voeux Road Central
Morrison Street
Connaught Road Central
Des Voeux Road West
Kennedy Town Praya
Sai Cheung Street
Belcher's Street
Victoria Road

Accidents
In the morning of 28 January 1984 a deadly accident involving a Guy Arab V on route 1 occurred at Wong Nai Chung Road in Happy Valley. The bus crashed into pedestrians, who were mostly parents and grandparents queuing up on the pavement to obtain admission forms from St. Paul's Primary Catholic School, after the driver lost control of it. A total of 6 deaths and 8 injuries were recorded and the government conducted an independent inquiry to delve into the causes.

References

Bus routes in Hong Kong